S82 may refer to:

Automobiles 
 Daihatsu Hijet (S82), a kei truck and microvan
 Stola S82 Spyder, a concept car
 Scania S82, a Scania bus

Other uses 
 Blériot-SPAD S.82, a French advertising biplane
 S82 Zhengzhou–Minquan Expressway, expressway in Henan, China
 S82, a line of the St. Gallen S-Bahn